Drury Lane Theatre may refer to:

 Theatre Royal, Drury Lane, a theatre in the Covent Garden area of London, England
 Drury Lane Theatre (Illinois), a theater near Chicago, United States

See also
Drury Lane (disambiguation)